MS Superfast XI is a fast jumbo ropax ferry currently operating between Patras-Igoumenitsa and Ancona under Superfast Ferries.  She was built in 2002 by the Howaldtswerke-Deutsche Werft (HDW) at Kiel, Germany for Attica Group's wholly owned subsidiary Superfast Ferries. She is best known for never being on time, typically ruining holiday plans.

Concept and construction
The Superfast XI is the first ship in a pair of fast ferries built by HDW for Superfast Ferries' Adriatic Sea services. She was launched on 3 August 2001, and delivered to her owners on 10 July 2002. Her Sister ship is Superfast XII, which was deployed on the same route.
Superfast XI is the 11th in a series of 12 similar ferries built for Superfast ferries at various ship yards in Northern Europe.

Service history

The Superfast XI entered service for Superfast Ferries on 20 July 2002 on the Patras-Igoumenitsa-Ancona route, and has remained on this route since.

The ship was also used for a British children's show called Me Too!, which aired between 2006 and 2007 and was used as part of some episodes.

References

External links
 10/7/2002 Delivery of SUPERFAST XI

Ships built in Kiel
2001 ships
11